Ludwigslust is a central castle town of Mecklenburg-Vorpommern, Germany, 40 km south of Schwerin. Since 2011 it has been part of the Ludwigslust-Parchim district.

Ludwigslust is part of the Hamburg Metropolitan Region. The former royal residential town is known for its rich heritage, especially the famed Ludwigslust Palace, known as Versailles of the North.

History

In 1724 Prince Ludwig, the son of Frederick, Duke of Mecklenburg, decided to build a hunting lodge near a small hamlet called Klenow. Later, after his succession to the Dukedom, this became his favourite residence and he named it accordingly Ludwigslust ("Ludwig's pleasure/desire"). In 1765 Ludwigslust became the capital of the duchy in place of Schwerin. The town was enlarged by a residential palace (the castle). This situation continued until 1837, when Grand Duke Paul Friedrich returned the capital status to Schwerin.

The Wöbbelin concentration camp—sometimes referred to as Ludwigslust concentration camp—was established by the SS near the city of Ludwigslust in 1945.  At the end of World War II, as the Line of contact between Soviet and other Allied forces formed, Ludwigslust was captured by British troops initially, then handed over to American troops.  After several months the US troops departed and allowed Soviet troops to enter under the Yalta agreement designating the occupation of Mecklenburg to be administered by the Soviets.

Sights
 Schloss Ludwigslust, a Baroque residential palace built in 1772–1776, according to plans by Johann Joachim Busch. It is called the "Little Versailles of Mecklenburg". The palace is in the middle of the palace garden (Schlosspark), a vast park (120 ha.) in the English style, with canals, fountains and artificial cascades.
 The Stadtkirche (Municipal- / City-Church), built in 1765–1770 in Neoclassical style with Baroque sway. Its classical design, with a portico resting on six doric columns, gives the church an appearance similar to a Greek temple.

Transport

Ludwigslust railway station is served by ICE, EC, IC and RE services.

Twin towns — sister cities

Ludwigslust is twinned with:
 Ahrensburg, Germany
 Muscatine, United States
 Kamskoye Ustye, Russia

Notable people

 Frederick Louis, Hereditary Grand Duke of Mecklenburg-Schwerin (1778–1819), Hereditary Prince of Mecklenburg, Hereditary Grand Duke of Mecklenburg in Mecklenburg-Schwerin, member of the House of Mecklenburg-Schwerin
 Rudolph Suhrlandt (1781–1862), portrait painter and lithographer
 Duchess Charlotte Frederica of Mecklenburg-Schwerin (1784–1840), duchess of Mecklenburg; Crown Princess of Denmark
 Franz Passow (1786–1833), classical philologist
 Ludwig von Lützow (politician) (1793–1872), Mecklenburg statesman and politician
 Paul Frederick, Grand Duke of Mecklenburg-Schwerin (1800–1842), Grand Duke of Mecklenburg
 Franz Benque (1841–1921), photographer
 Ludwig Beissner (1843–1927), botanist
 Frederick Francis III, Grand Duke of Mecklenburg-Schwerin (1851–1897), Grand Duke of Mecklenburg in Mecklenburg-Schwerin
 Duke Paul Frederick of Mecklenburg (1852–1923), Duke of Mecklenburg, General of the Cavalry
 Duchess Marie of Mecklenburg-Schwerin (1854–1920), Grand Duchess of Russia
 Johannes Gillhoff (1861–1930), teacher, folklorist and writer (born in Glaisin)
 Duke Christian Louis of Mecklenburg (1912–1996), nobleman, head of the house Mecklenburg
 Annelies Burmeister (1928–1988), singer
 Manfred Osten (born 1938), author and cultural historian
 Bernd Spier (born 1944), crooner
 Christoph Biemann (born 1952), author, director and television supporter
 Helmut Holter (born 1953), politician 
 Birgit Jerschabek (born 1969), long-distance runner
 Bastian Reinhardt (born 1975), footballer

References

External links
 official site (town)
 official site (county)
 The Embracing Forest An American visits Ludwigslust and vicinity in 2005 and finds more history than he expected.

Populated places established in the 18th century
Cities and towns in Mecklenburg
Ludwigslust-Parchim
Populated places established in 1765
Grand Duchy of Mecklenburg-Schwerin